Thomas Ponce Gill (April 21, 1922 – June 3, 2009) was a Hawaii politician. A member of the Democratic party, he served in the United States Congress from 1963 to 1965 and was the fourth lieutenant governor of Hawaii from 1966 to 1970. He unsuccessfully ran for governor twice, in 1970 and 1974.

Early life
Born in Honolulu, Hawaii, Gill attended public schools (Lincoln Elementary and Roosevelt High School). He was a decorated infantryman in the Pacific Theatre during World War II, earning a Bronze Star and a Purple Heart.

After the war, he attended law school at Boalt Hall at UC-Berkeley and began practicing law in Hawaii.

Career
Gill served in Hawaii's territorial legislature and, after statehood in 1959, became a member of the first state house delegation, representing the 15th district until his time in  Congress. He was elected to one of his state's two Congressional seats in 1962 and served one term. In Congress, he was a staunch supporter of liberal causes, including civil rights. He then worked as the director of Hawaii's Office of Economic Opportunity. In 1964, Gill chose not to seek reelection and instead ran unsuccessfully for U.S. Senator, losing to Republican incumbent Hiram Fong. In 1966, he was elected Lieutenant Governor with incumbent Governor John A. Burns.

During his term as Lieutenant Governor, Gill, considered outspoken and acerbic, developed differences with Burns, and was never shy about criticizing the incumbent, despite being part of his administration. In 1970, Gill challenged Burns in the Democratic primary. Gill ran as a reformer, campaigning against what he described as an entrenched, corrupt political machine. He narrowly lost, even though Burns significantly outspent him in a savvy campaign that included sophisticated use of expensive image-building television spots. Most in the state's large Japanese population remained loyal to Burns, who had spearheaded their rise to political power during the 1950s. Before Neil Abercrombie lost in 2014 this race stood as the closest anyone came to a primary defeat of an incumbent governor of Hawaii. Gill ran in the primary for governor again in 1974, but lost again in the primary to George Ariyoshi, who had succeeded him as lieutenant governor. After failing both campaigns, he resumed his career as a lawyer.

Papers

Thomas P. Gill donated 86 record center boxes of material to the University of Hawaii at Manoa Library in May 2001. The bulk of the papers cover Gill's two years in Congress and four years in the Hawaii Lt. Governor's office. The collection is rich in material documenting his enthusiastic political life and his concerns about nuclear power; the environment; land development, especially on the Big Island of Hawaii; social and economic justice; and the high cost of living in Hawaii. There is a smaller amount of material from his pre- and post-Congressional life.

The papers are arranged in five series: Political Offices (held by Gill), 1955–1970; Politics (Democratic Party, Hawaii and National), 1952–1972; Personal (election campaigns and biographical material), 1939–2001; Memorabilia (mostly election campaigns), 1940–2005 and bulk 1958–1980; Audiovisual (audiotapes, films, photographs; primarily election campaigns and Big Island development), 1958–1974.

The papers were arranged and described from July 2005 through March 2006 by archivist Ellen Chapman, and are available to researchers in the Library's Archives & Manuscripts Department by appointment. A Finding Aid, which provides a timeline, series descriptions, and list of specific topics covered in the collection is available at The Thomas P. Gill Papers web site.

Personal life
Gill was the son of Thomas Gill (born in New York in 1870) and Lorin Johnston Tarr (born in Kansas in 1889), and the grandson of Dr. Charles Robert Gill (born in New York in 1821) and María Dolores Ponce de León (born in Cuba in 1834 to Cuban parents).

Gill married Lois Hanawalt in 1947 and had six children, including two sons who have been involved in Hawaiian politics. His son Gary served on the Honolulu City Council and son Tony is a labor lawyer who considered seeking the governorship in 2006. Gill died in 2009 in Honolulu, aged 87.

See also
 List of minority governors and lieutenant governors in the United States
 List of Hispanic and Latino Americans in the United States Congress

References

External links

Honolulu Star-Bulletin article on role in 1964 Civil Rights Act

|-

|-

1922 births
2009 deaths
20th-century American politicians
United States Army personnel of World War II
American politicians of Cuban descent
Hispanic and Latino American members of the United States Congress
Democratic Party members of the United States House of Representatives from Hawaii
Hawaii lawyers
Lieutenant Governors of Hawaii
Democratic Party members of the Hawaii House of Representatives
Members of the Hawaii Territorial Legislature
Politicians from Honolulu
President Theodore Roosevelt High School alumni
UC Berkeley School of Law alumni
20th-century American lawyers
United States Army soldiers
Hawaii National Guard personnel